Flora Peel (born 19 September 1996) is an English field hockey player who plays for the England and Great Britain national teams.

She has played club hockey for Haagsche Delftsche Mixed and Wimbledon.

She won a Commonwealth gold medal at Birmingham in August 2022 with the England hockey team.   It was the first time in history that England had won the Commonwealth gold.

References 

Living people
1996 births
English female field hockey players
Commonwealth Games gold medallists
Commonwealth Games gold medallists for England
Field hockey players at the 2022 Commonwealth Games
Female field hockey midfielders
Haagsche Delftsche Mixed players
Expatriate field hockey players
English expatriate sportspeople in the Netherlands
Medallists at the 2022 Commonwealth Games